Saint Patrick is a civil parish in Charlotte County, New Brunswick, Canada, located west of St. George and Saint Andrews. It comprises a single local service district (LSD), which is a member of the Southwest New Brunswick Service Commission (SNBSC).

The Census subdivision of the same name shares the parish's boundaries.

Origin of name
Historian William F. Ganong believed the name suggested by other Saint names in the area.

Five of the original six mainland parishes of Charlotte County used names of major saints recognised by the Church of England: Andrew (Scotland), David (Wales), George (England), Patrick (Ireland), and Stephen.

History
Saint Patrick was erected in 1786 as one of Charlotte County's original parishes, including parts of Saint Croix Parish but not all of modern Saint Patrick.

Boundaries
Saint Patrick Parish is bounded:

 on the north by a line beginning about 300 metres southeast of the junction of Whittier Road, Birneys Lake Road, and Route 770, at the northwestern corner of a grant to Chas. Burns, then running east-northeasterly along the Burns grant and its prolongation to a point about 2.7 kilometres northeast of Bonny River Lake;
 on the east by a line beginning on the prolongation of the rear line of a grant to John Carson, northwest of Sherard Beach, then southerly along the prolongation, the Carson grant, and its prolongation the shore near the western end of Shore Road;
 on the south by Passamaquoddy Bay, Big Bay, and Birch Cove
 on the southwest by the southwestern line of a grant to Francis Welsh, then a line running from the western corner of the Welsh grant to the southwestern corner of a grant to Peter Sime, about midway between the South Glenelg Road and the Frye Road where it meets the southern end of Gibson Lake;
 on the west by a line running northerly along the Sime grant and its prolongation nearly to Route 1, then easterly about 150 metres, then northerly to Bonaparte Lake, then generally northerly along grant lines to Eastman Lake, northeasterly to Twin Lakes, then following the zigzagging western line of a 2500-acre grant to James Allanshaw to a point about 900 metres west of Doyle Lake, on the southernmost corner of a grant to John H. Armstrong;
 on the northwest by a line running northeasterly along the Armstrong grant to its eastern corner, about 1.1 kilometres past the Route 760 bridge over the North Branch Campbell Brook, then northwesterly along the northeastern line of the Armstrong grant and its prolongation to a point near the old railway, about 75 metres south of Wilson Road at the western corner of a grant to Jeremiah Sprague, then northeasterly along the Sprague grant to the Digdeguash River, then downstream about 300 metres to the northern line of a grant to John Strang, then northeasterly to the northern corner of the Strang grant, then southeasterly about 50 metres to the starting point;
 including Hardwood Island, Hospital Island, and any islands closer to shore.

Evolution of boundaries
The southern line of the Cape Ann Association grant in Saint David Parish was prolonged eastward to the Saint John County to provide the northern line of all parishes in the eastern part of Charlotte County; in Saint Patrick's case the line cut through McMinn and south of Birneys Lake. The eastern and southern lines were the same, while the western line ran from north of Libbey Lane straight to Mitchell Brook near Birch Cove, cutting through Saint Croix Parish and putting a strip of southwestern Saint Patrick in Saint Andrews Parish that would be inherited by Saint Croix Parish when it was erected.

In 1814 the parish was extended north to the county line.

In 1856 the northern part of Saint Patrick was erected as Dumbarton Parish.

In 1881 an area around Cathcart Road, Giles Road, and Armstrong Mill Road was transferred to Saint Croix Parish.

In 1896 the southern part of the boundary with Saint Croix was moved west, transferring the remainder of modern Saint Patrick.

In 1958 the boundary with Saint Croix was altered to run entirely along grant lines, transferring small areas to Saint Croix.

Local service district
The local service district of the parish of Saint Patrick comprises the entire parish.

The LSD was established in 1970 to assess for fire protection. First aid and ambulance services were added in 1975.

Today Saint Patrick assesses for only the basic LSD services of fire protection, police services, land use planning, emergency measures, and dog control. The taxing authority is 516.00 Saint Patrick.

Communities
Communities at least partly within the parish.

 Bethel
 Bocabec
 Bocabec Cove
 Digdeguash
 Elmsville
 Johnson Settlement
 Kerrs Ridge
 McMinn

Bodies of water
Bodies of water at least partly within the parish.

 Bocabec River
 Bonny River
 Digdeguash River
 Clarence Stream
 Big Bay
 Passamaquoddy Bay
 Digdeguash Basin
 more than twenty officially named lakes

Islands
Islands at least partly within the parish.

 Dicks Island
 Gird Island
 Hardwood Island
 Hog Island
 Hospital Island
 Long Island
 MacDougalls Island

Other notable places
Parks, historic sites, and other noteworthy places at least partly within the parish.
 Caughey-Taylor Nature Preserve
 Caughey-Taylor Protected Natural Area
 Ovenhead Protected Natural Area

Demographics

Population

Language

Access Routes
Highways and numbered routes that run through the parish, including external routes that start or finish at the parish limits:

Highways

Principal Routes

Secondary Routes:

External Routes:
None

See also
List of parishes in New Brunswick

Notes

References

Local service districts of Charlotte County, New Brunswick
Parishes of Charlotte County, New Brunswick